Río Negro is a river that divides the countries of Honduras and Nicaragua along the Pacific coast. Its path was substantially altered by Hurricane Mitch in October 1998. It mostly runs through a very undeveloped jungle region of the 2 countries.

Rivers of Honduras
Rivers of Nicaragua
International rivers of North America
Honduras–Nicaragua border
Border rivers